John Carter Risley  (born April 26, 1948) is a Canadian billionaire businessman with interests in fisheries, food supplements, and communications. He is the co-founder of Clearwater Seafoods.

Early life and career
Risley was born on April 26, 1948, in Halifax, Nova Scotia, the son of Robert Campbell Risley (1908–1964), the first commanding officer of a military police unit and later an insurance broker, and Patricia Anne Bourke (1920–2014). He never attended university, instead choosing a career in real estate. By 1976 he was struggling through a housing slump and he opened a lobster business in Bedford, Nova Scotia.

Major holdings

Clearwater Fine Foods

Within ten years of its founding in 1976, Clearwater had grown into one of the largest international food fish businesses by specializing in high return products including scallops, lobster, clams, coldwater shrimp and crab, which it air-freights around the world. It is the largest holder of rights in Canada for each of these shellfish species and by 2008, it owned the rights to all offshore lobster fished in offshore Atlantic Canadian waters and all Arctic surf clams. By 2008, the fleet included ten factory freezers (the largest such fleet in Canada) and the entire international fleet totalled 21 vessels. Its Argentinian fleet fishes Antarctic scallop.

The business became an income trust in 2002 at which time Risley turned the business over to Colin MacDonald. The company has since had a full recovery and has become one of the world largest vertically integrated shellfish harvesters, processors, and distributors. In 2014, they received the Rabobank award for innovation. In 2016 they purchased the largest shellfish producer in the UK, MacDuff Shellfish Group.

Ocean Nutrition Canada
His company is the major shareholder in Ocean Nutrition Canada, which he founded in 1997 as a manufacturer of fish oil-derived dietary supplements. Headquartered and with R&D offices in Dartmouth, Nova Scotia, it has manufacturing facilities in Mulgrave, Nova Scotia, Arcadia, Wisconsin, and Peru. It is the world's largest producer of omega-3 fatty acids.

In 2010, the company announced the accidental discovery of ONC T18 B, the most prolific strain of oil-producing algae known, which appears capable of producing oil at a rate 60 times greater than other types of algae being used for the generation of biofuels. It has embarked on a four-year R&D program to determine whether the algae is a viable a fossil fuel replacement.

Columbus Communications 
Risley was a major shareholder in Columbus Communications, a Caribbean cable television and Internet provider which he co-founded in 2004. He entered the business with Brendan Paddick from Grand Falls, Newfoundland and was a board member of the company based in Freeport, Bahamas. In March 2015, the company was acquired by Cable & Wireless Communications at a cost of US$1.85 billion. He is now a non-executive director of Cable & Wireless.

Gifts and Donations

Risley provided 25 million CDN in funding to the Ocean Frontier Institute, an ocean research centre based in Dalhousie University. "Risley’s gift to OFI is the culmination of his long-time association with Dalhousie University and its many stakeholders, both internal and external."

Personal life
His ex-wife is the former Judy MacDonald of Halifax. The Risley 32,000-square-foot home near Chester, Nova Scotia overlooks the Atlantic Ocean on a  property formerly owned by Joseph N. Pew, Jr., founder of Sunoco. After purchasing the property, Risley added another 210 acres to the estate. Besides a mansion, he has a barn with cows purchased from the Rockefeller family and his horses include Dutch Warmbloods, which he shows.

In 2010, their daughter Sarah Risley married Guy Barnett, "a British deckhand who came to Canada to work on Risley's yacht".

His brother is the Halifax restaurateur, caterer and hotelier Robert Risley.

Risley was made an officer of the Order of Canada in 1998.

Since his divorce from Judy Risley (MacDonald) John has built a second home in South End Halifax with his girlfriend, Amy Gordinier-Regan (owner of skinfix) and her two children.

Since 2009, Risley has owned a 246-foot megayacht, Northern Star, which has been listed for sale at $170 million.

References

Living people
Businesspeople from Nova Scotia
People from Halifax, Nova Scotia
Officers of the Order of Canada
1948 births
Canadian billionaires